ExecuJet is an international business aviation company headquartered at Zurich Airport, Switzerland. The company operates in Africa, Asia Pacific, Caribbean, Europe, Latin America and the Middle East. The Group services include aircraft management, charter, fixed-base operations (FBO) and completions consulting. The company employs more than 750 staff worldwide and operates a managed fleet of over 133 aircraft

History

ExecuJet began its first operation based at Lanseria Airport in Johannesburg, South Africa in 1991 as a maintenance provider. The facility was appointed in 1993 as a Major Service Centre by Honeywell (formerly Allied Signal) and a Learjet Authorised Service Facility by Bombardier.

In 1994, the firm extended its offer to include services, deployed in concert with a Bombardier Business Aircraft sales franchise. In 1995, the firm became a Canadair authorized service facility. In 1997, it opened in Denmark as ExecuJet Scandinavia.

In 1999, ExecuJet Middle East was established in Dubai and the Bombardier sales franchise expanded to 10 Middle Eastern countries.

ExecuJet Australia was founded in 2000. It included an aircraft management and maintenance centre at Sydney Airport and awarded dealership rights for Australia, New Zealand and the Pacific. The facility was also appointed as Bombardier Authorised Service Facility and Gulfstream authorized warranty repair facility.

ExecuJet expanded its European operations in 2001 with an aircraft management business, a Fixed Base Operation (FBO) and its offices in Zurich became the headquarters for ExecuJet. Bombardier adds Switzerland to ExecuJet’s business aircraft dealership.

In 2002, ExecuJet expanded its services into Latin America with operations at two Mexican Airports in Monterrey and an extended facility at Lanseria.

The firm opened in Dubai in 2005 and ExecuJet was appointed as a Middle East Bombardier authorized service centre. In Berlin, ExecuJet acquired an equity stake in Lufthansa Bombardier Aviation Services (LBAS), in a joint venture partnership with Lufthansa Technik and Bombardier.

During 2006, a FBO at Berlin Schönefeld opened, and ExecuJet Australasia opened a line maintenance base in Melbourne, Australia.

In 2008, ExecuJet acquired a hangar at Singapore’s Seletar Airport, where it still oversees maintenance activities. The firm was also granted an Air Operator’s Certificate (AOC) for the United Kingdom. Representative offices were opened in Mumbai, Beijing and Moscow.

In 2009, ExecuJet South Africa occupied a new FBO facility in Cape Town in anticipation of the 2010 FIFA World Cup. The wider firm was restructured around an OEM-independent business model. Later that year, ExecuJet Malaysia opened a maintenance base in Kuala Lumpur.

In the year 2010 Berlin Airports selected ExecuJet Europe as the operator of the General Aviation Terminal, and ExecuJet Mexico opened an office at Toluca Airport. In France, ExecuJet partnered with Advanced Air Support, for the FBO at Paris Le Bourget Airport, and a joint venture partnership was established with China Sichuan Haite and ExecuJet Haite Aviation Services China was born, based at Tianjin Binhai International Airport.

ExecuJet’s continued its worldwide expansion with the opening of brand new FBO facilities such as Frankfurt, Melbourne, Wellington, Gerona, Ibiza, Barcelona, Valencia and ExecuJet Europe winning the Cambridge FBO tender. A new FBO was opened at Istanbul Atatürk Airport, Turkey run by Bilen Air Service in strategic partnership with ExecuJet.

During 2012, the FBO in Cambridge was opened, and ExecuJet and RUAG announced a partnership FBO in Geneva. Meanwhile, in Indonesia an agreement was signed with Angkasa Pura 1 for the management of General Aviation Terminals in Indonesia. In Nigeria an FBO was opened at Lagos International Airport, and our Dubai office expands the FBO at Dubai International Airport.

ExecuJet Australasia expanded with the establishment of Maintenance facilities in Perth in 2013, and ExecuJet Europe further. At the same time, in the Middle East, ExecuJet expands its presence with a joint venture with NAS Holdings for an FBO in Riyadh.

In 2014, a new FBO facility was built in Bali. ExecuJet already started operating from temporary facilities at Bali International Airport. The Bali facility was the first terminal to be opened following the signing of a Memorandum of Cooperation in June 2012 for ExecuJet to exclusively design, construct and manage General Aviation Terminals at up to 13 airports managed by state-owned Indonesian aviation company Angkasa Pura 1. The same year, our Cambridge operations was granted a helicopter AOC, and Europe launches helicopter services in the United Kingdom.

In 2015, ExecuJet was acquired by the Luxaviation Group. With Luxaviation is headquartered in Luxembourg, and with ExecuJet has a combined staff of 1,500 and a fleet of over 250 business jets. ExecuJet began operations in Bali in the same year.

The acquisition of ExecuJet by the Luxaviation Group started the process of centralizing certain operational services in a shared services structure based in Cambridge. CAMO and Dispatch services were the first to be centralised, with Travel, Training and Procurement following shortly after. During this process, ExecuJet UK recruited dozens of employees, eventually outgrowing their location at Cambridge City Airport and moved to Fulbourn.

In 2016, ExecuJet opened FBOs in Munich, Germany, New Delhi, India, and a second FBO in Riyadh, Saudi Arabia. April saw the opening of a FBO in Monterrey, Mexico – the first in Latin America, as well as the opening of St. Maarten, Caribbean in June.

In 2017, ExecuJet opened another FBO in Australia, now also based in Sydney, and partnered with Airport St. Gallen-Altenrhein to manage an FBO facility.

In 2019, Luxaviation sold ExecuJet's Aircraft Maintenance business to Dassault Aviation and closed their FBO location at Cambridge City Airport, relocating all ExecuJet UK offices and employees to a new facility in Newmarket, Suffolk.

In 2020, ExecuJet announced the acquisition of Jet Aviation’s FBOs in Berlin and Munich, doubling the capacity of ExecuJet FBO facilities in the popular German cities.

Locations
ExecuJet operates out of 34 locations worldwide including Bali, Barcelona, Berlin Schoenefeld, Brussels, Cape Town, Copenhagen, Dubai International, Dubai South, Girona, Hong Kong, Ibiza, Istanbul Atatürk Airport, Istanbul Sabiha Gokcen Airport, Johannesburg, Kuala Lumpur, Lagos, Melbourne, Monterrey, Moscow, Munich, New Delhi, Newmarket, Palma, Perth, Riyadh, Seychelles, Singapore, St. Gallen-Altenrhein, St. Maarten, Sydney,  Toluca, Valencia, Wellington and Zurich

AOC
ExecuJet holds six fixed, and one rotatory Air Operating Certificates (AOCs) for Switzerland, United Kingdom, Denmark, United Arab Emirates, South Africa, Australia and Mexico.

References

External link

Airlines of Switzerland
Airlines established in 1991